Rockliffe may refer to:

People

Rockliffe Fellowes (1883–1950), Canadian actor
David Lunn-Rockliffe (1924–2011), British businessman
Thornton Rockliffe (1887–1961), Australian cricketer

Others

Rockliffe Park (Hurworth), training facility of Middlesbrough F.C.
Rockliffe (TV series), British TV series

See also
Rockcliff (disambiguation)
Rockcliffe (disambiguation)
Rockliff